The Battle of the Ravine is a college rivalry game played annually by Henderson State University and Ouachita Baptist University. The football rivalry game is tied for the oldest rivalry game in NCAA Division II, alongside the Black Hills Brawl. The current, full title is the "Southern Bancorp Battle of the Ravine".

In its earliest days, the game was played on Thanksgiving Day, but now it is played as the last game on each team's schedule. It is a unique rivalry in that the two schools located in Arkadelphia, Arkansas are across the street from each other and the visiting team walks from their own locker room to the other team's stadium. Ouachita Baptist currently leads the series 46–43–6.

Game results

The 1931 game was played in Conway, Arkansas.

See also  
 List of NCAA college football rivalry games

References

College football rivalries in the United States
Henderson State Reddies football
Ouachita Baptist Tigers football
1895 establishments in Arkansas
Recurring sporting events established in 1895